Jonathan Gabriel Villagra Bustamante (born 28 March 2001) is a Chilean professional footballer who plays as a defender for Chilean Primera División side Unión Española.

Club career
As a child, Villagra was with Cobreloa until the age of 15 and next joined Unión Española youth system. Initially a attacking midfielder, once he was with Unión Española he became a central defender. He made his professional debut in the 2020 Primera División match against Cobresal on February 15, 2021, along with his teammate Gabriel Norambuena.

International career
He represented Chile at under-23 level in a 1–0 win against Peru U23 on 31 August 2022, in the context of preparations for the 2023 Pan American Games.

Personal life
His nickname is Jona, a short form of Jonathan. He has stated that his football models are Arturo Vidal and Sergio Ramos.

References

External links
 
 Jonathan Villagra at playmakerstats.com (English version of ceroacero.es)

2001 births
Living people
Footballers from Santiago
Chilean footballers
Chile youth international footballers
Association football defenders
Unión Española footballers
Chilean Primera División players